The men's 110 metres hurdles at the 2008 Summer Olympics took place on 18–21 August at the Beijing National Stadium. Forty-two athletes from 32 nations competed. The event was won by Dayron Robles of Cuba, the nation's second gold medal in the high hurdles.

Summary

Dayron Robles was the clear favorite, having set the world record just two months earlier.  He didn't disappoint leading the semi-final round by almost a tenth of a second, a huge margin on this level. In the final, Robles was out first, clearly ahead by the first hurdle; he pulled away to a clear victory. The two Americans, David Payne and David Oliver were clearly separating from the others for second place, Payne slightly ahead of Oliver, with only Ladji Doucouré within a stride of Oliver. Doucouré looked to be faster, and on the final dash to the finish line was clearly gaining on Oliver, who himself was gaining on Payne to make the finish much closer. Robles more than doubled his margin from the semifinal round, almost a quarter of a second ahead of Payne.

Background

This was the 26th appearance of the event, which is one of 12 athletics events to have been held at every Summer Olympics. Four finalists from 2004 returned: gold medalist Liu Xiang of China, silver medalist Terrence Trammell of the United States, fourth-place finisher Maurice Wignall of Jamaica, and eighth-place finisher Ladji Doucouré of France; fifth-place finisher Staņislavs Olijars of Latvia was entered but did not start. Since winning the gold in 2004, Liu had broken the world record in 2006 and won the world championship in 2007. However, Dayron Robles of Cuba had bettered Liu's mark two months before the Games and was favored over the home country hero. Further, there were rumors of Liu being injured.

Belarus and the Cayman Islands each made their first appearance in the event. The United States made its 25th appearance, most of any nation (having missed only the boycotted 1980 Games).

Qualification

Each National Olympic Committee (NOC) was able to enter up to three entrants providing they had met the A qualifying standard (13.55) in the qualifying period (1 January 2007 to 23 July 2008). NOCs were also permitted to enter one athlete providing he had met the B standard (13.72) in the same qualifying period. The maximum number of athletes per nation had been set at 3 since the 1930 Olympic Congress.

Competition format

The competition used the four-round format previously used in 1960 and since 1988, still using the eight-man semifinals and finals used since 1964. The "fastest loser" system, also introduced in 1964, was used in the first round.

The first round consisted of six heats, with 7 or 8 hurdlers each. The top four hurdlers in each heat, along with the eight next fastest overall, advanced to the quarterfinals. The 32 quarterfinalists were divided into four heats of 8 hurdlers each, with the top three in each heat, and the four next fastest overall, advancing. The 16 semifinalists were divided into two semifinals of 8 hurdlers each; the top four hurdlers in each advanced to the 8-man final.

Records
Prior to this competition, the existing world and Olympic records were as follows:

No new world or Olympic records were set for this event. The following national records were set during the competition:

Schedule

All times are China Standard Time (UTC+8)

Results

Round 1

Qualification: First 4 in each heat (Q) and the next 8 fastest (q) advance to the quarterfinals.

Heat 1

Heat 2

Heat 3

Heat 4

Heat 5

Heat 6

Van der Westen false-started; Liu was clearly in discomfort during the abortive run. He withdrew rather than returning to the starting blocks.

Overall results for round 1

Quarterfinals

Qualification: First 3 in each heat (Q) and the next 4 fastest (q) advance to the semifinals.

Quarterfinal 1

Quarterfinal 2

Quarterfinal 3

Quarterfinal 4

Overall results for quarterfinals

Semifinals
Qualification: First 4 in each heat(Q) advance to the Final.

Semifinal 1

The first semifinal start at 21:30 on 20 August 2008.

Semifinal 2

The second semifinal started at 21:39 on 20 August 2008.

Final

References

Athletics at the 2008 Summer Olympics
Sprint hurdles at the Olympics
Men's events at the 2008 Summer Olympics